Falculina antitypa is a moth in the family Depressariidae. It was described by Edward Meyrick in 1916. It is found in French Guiana.

The wingspan is 24–36 mm. The forewings and hindwings are identical to those of Falculina ochricostata.

References

Moths described in 1916
Falculina